During the 1994–95 English football season, Norwich City competed in the Premier League.

Season summary
Despite losing striker Chris Sutton to Blackburn Rovers before the start of the season in England's first £5 million transfer, Norwich made a strong start to the season and seemed capable of reproducing their impressive form of the two previous seasons. By Christmas, they stood seventh in the table and looked good bets for a UEFA Cup place.

But then it all went wrong, after an injury to first-choice goalkeeper Bryan Gunn. Their final good result of the season was a 2-1 victory over title challengers Newcastle United on New Year's Eve and after that, the Canaries went into a sudden freefall, won only one of their final 20 league games (a 3-0 home win over Ipswich Town in the East Anglian derby which still kept them in 11th) and plunged into 20th place and relegation after a seven-match losing streak followed by a draw - ending their nine-year tenure in the top flight just two years after they had narrowly missed out on the league title.

Just weeks before the end of the season, manager John Deehan handed in his resignation and vacated the manager's seat to make way for 36-year-old player-coach Gary Megson. Megson in turn quit after failing save Norwich from the drop. The man selected by chairman Robert Chase to revert Norwich's declining fortunes was Martin O'Neill, who had just taken Wycombe Wanderers to the brink of the Division Two play-offs in only their second season in the Football League.

Final league table

Results summary

Results by round

Results
Norwich City's score comes first

Legend

FA Premier League

FA Cup

League Cup

Players

First-team squad
Squad at end of season

Left club during season

Transfers

In

Out

Transfers in:  £3,000,000
Transfers out:  £7,950,000
Total spending:  £4,950,000

Notes

References

Norwich City F.C. seasons
Norwich City